The British Ulster Dominion Party was a minor political party in Northern Ireland during the 1970s.

The party began in 1975 as the Ulster Dominion Group, when Professor Kennedy Lindsay broke from the United Ulster Unionist movement (which would later emerge as the United Ulster Unionist Party), itself a breakaway from the Vanguard Progressive Unionist Party to form a new group that would fully support the idea of Dominion status for Northern Ireland. The UDG wanted effective independence for the Province, although the British monarch would continue as Head of state and would be represented by a Governor-General.

The UDG changed its name to the British Ulster Dominion Party in 1977 when it decided to take a more formalised role in Northern Irish politics. The party put up 4 candidates in Antrim town, Larne Town and Ballyclare in the local elections of that same year but found that it had very little support with none of the candidates  being able to achieve even 5% of the vote. Lindsay himself polled poorly in Ballyclare, finishing last with just 4% of the vote. Thereafter it was obvious that it could not mount a serious challenge to mainstream Unionism, despite the relatively high circulation of its tabloid newspaper The Ulsterman. Demoralised by the failure of 1977, the party had a very low profile thereafter. In Autumn 1982, shortly before the Assembly elections of October 1982, the party merged with the United Ulster Unionist Party (most of whose members had been former colleagues of Lindsay in Vanguard.) Lindsay stood unsuccessfully as a UUUP candidate in those elections in South Antrim and the UUUP was disbanded 2 years later.

References

Defunct political parties in Northern Ireland
Political parties established in 1975
Political parties disestablished in 1982
Ulster nationalist parties
1975 establishments in Northern Ireland